Rafael Mandelman (born October 17, 1973) is an American attorney and politician currently serving on the San Francisco Board of Supervisors, representing District 8.

Prior to his election to the Board of Supervisors, he served on the City College of San Francisco Board of Trustees. He was a deputy city attorney in Oakland, California in the Redevelopment, Real Estate & Rent Unit in the Advisory Division of the City Attorney's Office.

Mandelman has served as a commissioner on San Francisco’s Building Inspection Commission and Board of Appeals, a member of the Bay Area Jewish Community Relations Council, president of the Board of Directors of Livable City, and Co-Chair of the San Francisco LGBT Community Center Board. A past president of the Noe Valley and Harvey Milk LGBT Democratic Clubs, Mandelman has been an elected member of the San Francisco Democratic County Central Committee since 2006. He joined the Equality California Institute Board in 2020.

Early life 
Mandelman grew up in Laguna Beach, California with his mother. His parents divorced when he was three. His mother had various mental disorders and regularly in and out of the hospital. At 11 years old, his relatives convinced Mandelman to move to San Francisco, where his paternal grandmother was. But she was too old to take care of him so he lived between homes. Mandelman attended Brandeis Hillel Day School and Lick-Wilmerding High School.

Mandelman earned a B.A. in History from Yale College, a Master of Public Policy from Harvard’s John F. Kennedy School of Government, and a J.D. from UC Berkeley’s School of Law.

Political career 
Mandelman ran to represent District 8 in the 2010 San Francisco Board of Supervisors election, placing second against Scott Wiener.

Mandelman was elected to the City College of San Francisco Board of Trustees in 2012.

San Francisco Supervisor 
Mandelman defeated incumbent Jeff Sheehy to represent District 8 in the June 2018 San Francisco Board of Supervisors special election, replacing Sheehy for the duration of the term. Mandelman went on to win in the November general election.

In 2019, he authored an ordinance to create the Castro LGBTQ Cultural District; the ordinance was passed unanimously by the San Francisco Board of Supervisors.

Mental Health & Homelessness
Mandelman introduced legislation in 2018 to streamline the opening of more residential care facilities by removing the requirement that such facilities need to obtain conditional use permits if they are serving seven or more residents in several zoning districts, but not those zoned for single-family or two-family homes.

In 2019, Mandelman authored legislation implementing the housing conservatorship program created by Scott Wiener's SB 1045 for unhoused individuals suffering from severe mental illness and substance use disorder. Mandelman has repeatedly pushed for expansion of the City’s use of its existing conservatorship tools, and of State laws restricting eligibility for conservatorships.

In 2022, the Board of Supervisors unanimously passed an expanded version of Mandelman's 2020 “A Place for All” ordinance, making it the policy of the City and County of San Francisco to offer all people experiencing homelessness in the City a safe place to sleep. The ordinance requires the Department of Homelessness and Supportive Housing to prepare an implementation plan by December, 2022, including an estimate of how many people would be expected to accept shelter in the City, the cost of providing shelter for all people willing to accept it, and the annual cost of the program once fully operational.

Support of labor
Shortly after his 2018 election, Mandelman was arrested for blocking a street outside Marriott's Westin St. Francis hotel during a Labor Day protest against Marriott's wages. On June 28, 2019, the Board's Public Safety and Neighborhood Services Committee held a hearing on "worker rights in the gig economy," called by Supervisor Mandelman. In November, 2020, the Board of Supervisors unanimously approved an ordinance authored by Mandelman and Supervisor Shamann Walton requiring San Francisco International Airport airlines and contractors to expand health care benefits for employees.

Positions on housing
In 2018, Mandelman co-authored the Housing Preservation and Expansion Reform Act, increasing fines for the illegal demolition of homes in order to preserve rent-controlled housing and curb the loss of residential housing. Mandelman called for reform of the Ellis Act in 2018 to protect certain tenants, specifically vulnerable residents from marginalized communities, from evictions. Mandelman also sponsored legislation in support of California’s Affordable Housing Act to allow local jurisdictions to create their own rules regarding rent control.

Mandelman supported a resolution that expressed opposition to California Senate Bill 50, which mandates denser housing near “job-rich” areas and transit hubs in California. In 2019, Mandelman joined Mayor Breed to celebrate the renovation of 90 affordable housing units for seniors and people with disabilities in the city's Duboce Triangle neighborhood.

In 2021, Mandelman proposed to allow construction of fourplexes on single lots in San Francisco with the intent to increase the supply of housing, reduce rents, and alleviate the housing the shortage in San Francisco. Mandelman's aide explained that the bill was intended to preempt California Senate Bill 9, which was a new version of California Senate Bill 50 which Mandelman opposed.

In 2021, Mandelman opposed the construction of a 500-unit apartment complex on a Nordstrom's valet parking lot. He endorsed David Campos for California Assembly District 17. The San Francisco Chronicle tied this endorsement to Mandelman's vote to block the 500-unit housing construction project in Supervisor Matt Haney's district in San Francisco; Haney was running for the same district seat as Campos. According to the San Francisco Chronicle, it is out of the norm for supervisors to block projects in the district of another supervisor if that supervisor approves of the project.

In 2022, the Board of Supervisors passed Mandelman's legislation to encourage the development of new fourplexes, and the Mayor vetoed it, citing provisions she claimed would make it harder to build more housing. In response to a Tweet from the California Department of Housing and Community Development applauding Mayor Breed's veto, Mandelman posted "hold your applause," citing the fact that of the eighteen project applications submitted under Senate Bill 9 since January, only four are for fourplexes; the rest are duplexes and lot splits.

Personal life 
Mandelman came out as gay while at Yale University.

References

External links 

 Official website
 Campaign website

Living people
San Francisco Board of Supervisors members
Yale University alumni
UC Berkeley School of Law alumni
Harvard Kennedy School alumni
American LGBT city council members
LGBT people from San Francisco
Gay politicians
California Democrats
Lawyers from San Francisco
21st-century American politicians
1973 births